List of aerophones used in Caribbean music, including the islands of the Caribbean Sea, Guyana, Suriname, French Guiana, Belize, and Bermuda.

References

Notes 

Aerophones
Caribbean aerophones
Aerophones